The Invasion of Ambon was a combined Indonesian military operation which aimed to seize and annex the self proclaimed Republic of South Maluku.

Background 
Following the Dutch-Indonesian Round Table Conference, the Netherlands recognized the independence of the Republic of United States of Indonesia (RUSI). The RUSI was a federation with a People’s Representative Council consisting of 50 representatives from the Republic of Indonesia and 100 from the various states according to their populations. Distrusting the Javanese and Muslim-dominated Republic of Indonesia, the largely Protestant and pro-Dutch South Moluccans - who had long contributed forces to the Royal Netherlands East Indies Army (KNIL) - declared the independence of the Republic of South Maluku in Ambon and Seram on 25 April 1950. The declaration was led by former East Indonesia justice minister Christiaan Robbert Steven Soumokil, while Johanis Manuhutu was made president of the new republic.

The independence declaration said the South Moluccas no longer felt secure within State of East Indonesia and were cutting their ties with RUSI. And later, former KNIL soldiers garrisoned at Ambon joined RMS and formed Armed Forces of RMS (APRMS). These are among troops who have been awaiting demobilization or transfer to the Armed Forces of RIS (APRIS).

On 17 August 1950, the Indonesian President, Sukarno, proclaimed the restoration of the unitary state of the Republic of Indonesia. This RMS was not acknowledged by Sukarno and on his orders, the Indonesian military invaded the Moluccan island of Buru and a part of the island of Ceram.

Invasion of Ambon 
At the time of the RMS proclamation, there were 7,345 former KNIL troops stationed in Ambon, including 2,500 Ambonese. These soldiers became the backbone of APRMS. After a naval blockade by the Indonesian navy, an invasion of Ambon took place on 28 September 1950. The APRMS fled from the town of Ambon before the invading Indonesian troops had taken up positions in old Dutch fortifications in the hills over looking the town. From here they waged guerilla warfare. The TNI occupied the northern half of the island, but had been halted by fierce Ambonese resistance at the one kilometre wide isthmus, which links it with the southern half. On 5 November the city of Ambon came into the hands of the Indonesian army. The RMS government fled to Ceram in December to continue the war in the form of a guerilla warfare. "The town of Ambon had been wiped out except for four buildings," an eyewitness told an Australian newspaper. "The Indonesians had constantly shelled the town and planes had strafed it, but much of the destruction had been caused by arson." The fighting was ferocious, since TNI's opposition were well-trained former KNIL soldiers including the Green Caps. The Indonesian army suffered severe losses. Although the RMS soldiers were KNIL members which were well-trained and renowned for their fighting skills, the resistance of the APRMS soldiers was eventually put down in November 1950. However, Lt. Col. Slamet Rijadi who was the commander of the Indonesian army in the Maluku sector and an important participant during the offensive was killed during the final day of the campaign.

Dutch involvement 
During the Indonesian National Revolution, the Dutch had to disband the reinstated KNIL, and the native soldiers had the choice of either being demobilised or joining the army of the Republic of Indonesia. Due to a deep distrust of the Republican leadership, which was predominantly Javanese Muslim, this was an extremely difficult choice for the Protestant Ambonese, and only a minority chose to serve with the Indonesian Army. Disbanding proved a complicated process and, in 1951, two years after the transfer of sovereignty, not all soldiers had been demobilised. The Dutch were under severe international pressure to disband the colonial army and temporarily made these men part of the regular Dutch army, while trying to demobilise them in Java. Herein lay the source of the discontent among the Moluccan soldiers as, according to the KNIL policy, soldiers had the right to choose the place where they were to be discharged at the end of their contract. The political situation in the new Republic of Indonesia was initially unstable and, in particular, controversy over a federal or centralised form of the state resulted in armed conflicts in which Ambonese ex-KNIL men were involved. In 1951 an independent Republic of the South Moluccas (Indonesian: RMS, Republik Maluku Selatan) was proclaimed at Ambon. The RMS had strong support among the Ambonese KNIL soldiers. As a consequence the Moluccan soldiers located outside the South Moluccas demanded to be discharged at Ambon. But Indonesia refused to let the Dutch transport these soldiers to Ambon as long as the RMS was not repressed, fearing prolonged military struggle. When after heavy fighting the RMS was repressed at Ambon, the soldiers refused to be discharged there. They now demanded to be demobilised at Seram, where pockets of resistance against Indonesia still existed. This was again blocked by Indonesia.

The Dutch government finally decided to transport the remaining men and their families to the Netherlands. They were discharged on arrival and 'temporarily' housed in camps until it was possible for them to return to the Moluccan islands. In this way around 12,500 persons were settled in the Netherlands, more or less against their will and certainly also against the original plans of the Dutch government.

Aftermath 
After the defeat of the RMS on Ambon by Indonesian forces in November 1950, the self-declared government withdrew to Seram, where an armed struggle continued on until December 1963. The government in exile moved to the Netherlands in 1966, following resistance leader and president Chris Soumokil's capture and execution by Indonesian authorities. The exiled government continues to exist, with John Wattilete as its incumbent president since April 2010.

United Nations 
The Proclamation of the RMS has been a subject on the agenda of the United Nations, but was displaced there by the Korean War. On October 1, the RMS government requested intervention from the UN Security Council, Australia and the Netherlands to invade Indonesian troops. The Netherlands indicated that this was a matter for the UN and referred to the RTC transfer.

Legacy 
The military engagements in Maluku prompted Kawilarang to establish what would later become Indonesia's special forces Kopassus.

See also 
 Makassar Uprising
 Operation Trikora
 Indonesia–Malaysia confrontation
 Maluku sectarian conflict

Notes

References 

Former Dutch colonies
20th-century conflicts
Military operations involving Indonesia
Dutch East Indies
Maluku Islands
01
Separatism in Indonesia
Indonesia–Netherlands relations
1950 in Indonesia
Cold War rebellions
Conflicts in 1950